The year 1939 was the 158th year of the Rattanakosin Kingdom of Siam. It was the fifth year in the reign of King Ananda Mahidol (Rama VIII), and is reckoned as year 2481 (1 January – 31 March) and 2482 (1 April – 31 December) in the Buddhist Era. The name of the country was changed to Thailand this year.

Incumbents
 King: Prajadhipok (Rama VII)
 Prime Minister: Field Marshal Plaek Phibunsongkhram

Births

Deaths

References

 
Thailand
1930s in Thailand
Years of the 20th century in Thailand
Siam
Siam